Laurent Mbanda (born 25 October 1954) is a Rwandan Anglican bishop. He was the bishop of the Diocese of Shyira when he was elected the fourth archbishop and primate of the Province of the Anglican Church of Rwanda on 17 January 2018, being enthroned on 10 June 2018.

Ecclesiastical career
He was born in Rwanda but spent a large part of his childhood in Burundi. He graduated at the Kenya Highlands Bible College, in Kericho, Kenya, before returning to Burundi, where he was ordained an Anglican priest. He moved to the United States in 1984, where he completed course work for an M.A. in Missiology at the Fuller Theological Seminary's School of World Missions, in Pasadena, United States, a Master of Arts in Christian Education at Denver Seminary and a PhD at Trinity International University, in Deerfield, Illinois.

He was consecrated Bishop of the Diocese of Shyira in March 2010. He was elected the fourth archbishop and primate of the Province of the Anglican Church of Rwanda on 17 January 2018, among five candidates, during the meeting the House of Bishops at St. Étienne Cathedral, in Kigali, and his enthronement took place on 10 June. 

He has been a longtime supporter of GAFCON, since he attended their first meeting in Jerusalem, in June 2008. He attended GAFCON III, in Jerusalem, from 17-22 June 2018. In 2019, Mbanda was elected vice chairman of the Global Fellowship of Confessing Anglicans.

He published Committed to Conflict: The Destruction of the Church in Rwanda (1997), co-written with Steve Wamberg, about the Rwandan genocide, and his autobiography, From Barefoot to Bishop (2017).

Views on church-state relations in Rwanda
In his book Committed to Conflict Mbanda wrote: The Hebraic model of theocracy, which would link spiritual leaders with political power, failed to become reality in Rwanda, but made a significant impact on the political leadership. Church leaders in Africa, and elsewhere, have to be careful to avoid combining religious and political functions. Church and mission leaders must watch the relationship between church and state, as these can be dangerous for the Church. In Rwanda they have demonstrated patterns of manipulation within the Church, and the abuse of governmental relationships by the Church.

Views on politics 
Mbanda defended the UK-Rwanda asylum plan saying that "Rwanda is ready to welcome people needing a home".

References

1954 births
Living people
Rwandan Anglicans
21st-century Anglican bishops in Africa
21st-century Anglican archbishops
Rwandan bishops
Anglican archbishops of Rwanda
Anglican bishops of Shyira
Anglican bishops of Gasabo
Anglican realignment people